Janssen may refer to:

Astronomy 
 Janssen (lunar crater)
 Janssen (Martian crater)
 Janssen (planet), an exoplanet also known as 55 Cancri e

Other 
 Janssen (surname) is a common Dutch surname, cognate of "Johnson"
 Janssen Biotech, American biotechnology company
 Janssen COVID-19 vaccine, a COVID-19 vaccine
 Janssen Pharmaceuticals, a Belgian company
 , World War II US Navy destroyer escort
 E. Janssen Building, a historic building in Eureka, California

See also 
 Jansen (disambiguation)
 Janssens